The 2021 Big Machine Spiked Coolers Grand Prix was an IndyCar motor race held on August 14, 2021 at the Indianapolis Motor Speedway Road Course. It was the 12th round of the 2021 IndyCar Series. This was also the first meeting at the Speedway since the death of Bob Jenkins.  Indianapolis area resident and well-known motorsport broadcaster Jamie Little replaced Jenkins, sharing public address duties with Allen Bestwick.  Dave Calabro, who shares duties with Bestwick, does not work the Verizon 200 meeting.

The 85-lap race was won by Team Penske's Will Power, clinching his first win of the season. IndyCar rookie Romain Grosjean finished second, repeating his best ever finish at the time, which was achieved at the same circuit in the GMR Grand Prix. Colton Herta of Andretti Autosport rounded out the podium places with his third-placed finish.

Background 
The event was held over two days on August 13-14, 2021 at the road course of the Indianapolis Motor Speedway in Speedway, Indiana. This was the second time the venue featured in the 2021 season, following the GMR Grand Prix in May 2021, and the third edition of this race, as it debuted as an October 2020 doubleheader.

The race was the 12th race of the 16-race calendar, held one week after the Big Machine Music City Grand Prix in Nashville, Tennessee and one week prior to the Bommarito Automotive Group 500.

Rinus VeeKay was the previous race winner, having won the GMR Grand Prix in May 2021.

Championship standings before the race 
Álex Palou stood top of the standings over Scott Dixon, who rose to second after his second-place finish in Nashville. Pato O'Ward was demoted to third following Dixon's rise to second, sitting over Josef Newgarden in fourth and Marcus Ericsson in fifth.

Honda maintained their lead over Chevrolet in the manufacturer's standings.

Entrants 
28 drivers entered the race. Dale Coyne Racing fielded a second entry with Rick Ware Racing for the fourth time in the season, with Cody Ware returning to drive the No. 52 car after his appearance at the previous race. 

Top Gun Racing returned to make their IndyCar race debut, after the team failed to qualify for the 2021 Indianapolis 500. Part-time NASCAR Xfinity Series driver R. C. Enerson, who piloted their No. 75 car on their Indy 500 qualifying attempt, returned to drive for the team.

Formula 2 driver and Alpine Academy member Christian Lundgaard made his IndyCar debut, as he was signed by Rahal Letterman Lanigan Racing to drive their No. 45 entry, previously driven by Santino Ferrucci in the Big Machine Music City Grand Prix.

Practice 
Practice 1 took place at 3:00 PM ET on August 13, 2021. The one-hour session was stopped with seven minutes remaining, as Colton Herta stopped at pit exit with a clutch problem and a warning light in his dashboard. Álex Palou was fastest in practice, with a time of 01:10.8839. Previous race winner Rinus VeeKay classified second, while Pato O'Ward finished third.

Qualifying 
Because of the compacted schedule as part of the NASCAR-INDYCAR doubleheader, qualifying, which started at 7:00 PM ET on August 13, 2021, was reduced to two rounds, with the third round omitted for time constraints. The six fastest drivers of each group in Round 1 advanced to the Firestone Fast 12, where they competed for pole position.  It was the latest time an INDYCAR session had started at the Speedway.

The second session of Round 1 was highlighted by Scott Dixon's spin on his last fast lap, just before the timing line, which by rule cancels his best two laps, and finished 13th in his group, meaning he started 26th. Dalton Kellett, Felix Rosenqvist, and James Hinchcliffe also had their laps deleted, as they failed to slow down during the local yellow that was raised due to Dixon's incident.

Pato O'Ward took pole with a time of 01:10.7147, with Will Power and Romain Grosjean second and third fastest respectively. Rahal Letterman Lanigan's Christian Lundgaard qualified for the second row in his first ever IndyCar appearance.

Qualifying classification 

 Notes
 Bold text indicates fastest time set in session.
  - Josef Newgarden received a six-place grid penalty due to an unapproved engine change.

Warmup 
Warmup took place at 8:45 AM ET on August 14, 2021. Marcus Ericsson was fastest with a time of 01:10.8839, ahead of Alexander Rossi in second and Josef Newgarden in third.

Race 
The race started at 12:30 PM ET. On the first lap, Scott McLaughlin went airborne after hitting a kerb in Turn 6, however no damage was caused. IndyCar debutant Christian Lundgaard took the lead of the race on lap 16, as the race leaders went to pit. On lap 18, Will Power overtook Pato O'Ward to take the effective lead of the race. Simon Pagenaud would take the lead from Lundgaard on lap 18, as the Danish driver pitted for fresh tyres. Pagenaud would then yield the lead to Power on lap 21, as he made his pit stop. As Pagenaud exited the pits, he emerged in front of Conor Daly, who attempted an overtake on Pagenaud in Turn 7, which failed and sent Daly to the grass, causing him to drop two positions from tenth to 12th. On the following lap, Colton Herta passed O'Ward to take second. O'Ward would continue to drop away from the podium places and eventually finished fifth.

On lap 68, Álex Palou retired from fourth position due to a mechanical failure, bringing out a caution that lasted three laps. He would later classify 27th, scoring only five points. After the race was restarted on lap 70, Romain Grosjean, who was third at the time, outbraked Herta in Turn 1 to take second position. Sébastien Bourdais and Ryan Hunter-Reay made contact on lap 73, sending them both off-track and down the order. The second caution of the day was caused after McLaughlin hit the rear of Rinus VeeKay's car on lap 76, causing VeeKay to spin and stall his vehicle in Turn 7. The caution lasted two laps.

Will Power ended his winless run as he finished first, ahead of Romain Grosjean, who equalled his highest-ever finish in second, and Colton Herta in third.

Race classification

Championship standings after the race 
Points leader Álex Palou saw his championship lead cut due to his 27th-place finish, as Pato O'Ward moved up to second – at Scott Dixon's expense, as he moved down to third.

Drivers' Championship standings

Engine manufacturer standings

 Note: Only the top five positions are included.

References

External links 

Grand Prix of Indianapolis
Big Machine Spiked
Big Machine Spiked Coolers Grand Prix